Gonnoscodina, Gonnos-Codina in sardinian language,  is a comune (municipality) in the Province of Oristano in the Italian region Sardinia, located about  northwest of Cagliari and about  southeast of Oristano.

Gonnoscodina borders the following municipalities: Baressa, Gonnostramatza, Masullas, Siddi, Simala.

References

Cities and towns in Sardinia